P. Bhanumathi Ramakrishna (7 September 1925 – 24 December 2005) was an Indian actress, singer, film producer, director, music composer, and novelist. She is regarded as the first female super star of Telugu cinema. She is also considered the first female director of Telugu cinema with her debut directorial Chandirani (1953). Bhanumathi appeared in over 100 films predominantly in Telugu and Tamil languages. She was awarded the Padma Bhushan in 2001 for her contribution to the Indian cinema. She was honored among "women in cinema" at the 30th International Film Festival of India.

Early life
Bhanumathi was born on 7 September 1925 in Doddavaram village of Prakasam district, near Ongole, Andhra Pradesh. She is the third child to Bommaraju Saraswatamma, Venkata Subbayya. She grew up watching her father perform in various stage shows. Her father, Venkata Subbayya, was a lover of classical music and trained her in music from an early age.

Career
Bhanumathi entered the film industry in 1939, and acted in over 100 films in Telugu and Tamil. She was also called as Ashtavadhani by the film industry people as she was a writer, actor, director, producer, singer, music director, editor and studio owner. She also had a good knowledge of astrology and philosophy. She is regarded as the first female super star of Telugu cinema.

Film career
She made her debut in Telugu cinema in 1939 as Kalindi (a 13 years old girl who is forced to marry an old man and ended her life by committing suicide) in Vara Vikrayam (Telugu), directed by C. Pullayya. She had acted in Malathi Madhavam, Dharma Patni and Bhaktimala. Her first popular film was Krishna Prema. Her next popular film was Swargaseema, a milestone film in her career. In Swargaseema, she played the role of a theater artist with negative shades who is after a married person for her personal benefits. Oho Pavurama song (sung by her) in Swargaseema became a super hit and she was showered with offers. She later acted in many memorable movies like Chakrapani, Laila Majnu, Vipranarayana, Malliswari, Batasari and Anthastulu. Her first film in Tamil was Ratnakumar in the year 1949 along with the famous hero of those day P. U. Chinnappa. This film was directed by Krishnan–Panju. In 1953, she made her directorial debut with Chandirani (made simultaneously in Tamil, Telugu and Hindi).

Her last film was made in 1998, entitled Pelli Kanuka. C. N. Annadurai gave her a title "Nadippukku Ilakkanam" (Grammar for acting) that suits her aptly. She was revered by many actors she had worked with like N. T. Rama Rao, Sivaji Ganesan, M. G. Ramachandran, Akkineni Nageswara Rao, Nagarjuna, Balakrishna, Chiranjeevi, Pawan Kalyan, Venkatesh for her bold and prolific versatility. One of her memorable movies in Tamil was Annai, in the year 1962 directed by Krishnan–Panju, where her acting was appreciated by all and also got the National Award for the film and for also performances in movies Anthasthulu and Palnati Yudham (1964) she received National Awards (Rashtrapati Award). She is the last recipient of Rashtrapati Award.

Due to her rift with Aluri Chakrapani, she left her role in Missamma movie (Initially Bhanumathi was shot for some scenes in the movie before being replaced by Savitri ) but after the release of the movie she watched and commented that "she lost a wonderful role but industry gained a talented actress like savitri" which showed her sportiveness and encouragement towards new actors.

Due to clash with Aluri Chakrapani, she produced a satirical movie on him titled Chakrapani which was a huge hit and became a classic in Tollywood for this movie she also worked as music director.

For the movie Anthasthulu (1964), VB Rajendra Prasad had approached Bhanumathi for the role of Akkineni Nageswara Rao's sister. She liked the subject and agreed to do the film immediately. The crew booked a room in "Ritz-Carlton" in Hyderabad and she did not want to waste money, so she offered to stay at Sarathi Studios, which had an open area and snakes. The next morning she woke up with her nails bitten by rats. The director decided to cancel the shoot, VB Rajendra Prasad rushed to see Bhanumathi applying iodine casually on the nails and asking when she could start work. While continuing with the shooting, she said, "If you cancel shoot for small things how will I be a Bhanumathi (which means 'shining like the sun' in Sanskrit)."

India's First Vice-President Sarvepalli RadhaKrishnan was a fan of her work. Telugu cinema Veterans like Jamuna, Savitri and so many actresses cited her as an inspiration for entering into movies. she is widely recalled by her close associates as 'Epitome of Self-Respect and Versatility'. She is the only Female Film Studio owner in our country. She is called as Ashtavadhani by Tamil people. After seeing her performance in Ragoon Radha film C.N.Annadurai honoured her with title "Nadippukku llakkanam".

In later years, she continued to act in pivotal roles in many hit movies like Tatamma Kala, Mangammagari Manavadu, Gadasari Atta Sogasari Kodallu, Muddula Manavaralu, Bamma Maata Bangaru Baata, Peddarikam and Pelli Kanuka.

In Malliswari, Chakrapani, Chandirani, Vipranarayana she played romantic, fun loving and playful characters. In movies like Tatamma Kala, Batasari, Chintamani, Annai and Mangammagari Manavadu she played different type of roles and received accolades and movies like Swargaseema, Antastulu, Palnati Yuddham and Peddarikam she played strong minded lady character roles with negative shades and done justice to the role proved that she was an accomplished actress who can easily portray both positive and negative roles with equal magnitude. She is first south Indian actress to receive Padma Awards

Apart from being a fine actress, she was also a talented musician. She was adept in both Carnatic and Hindustani music. She gave voice to her songs despite it being the norm to use playback singers for actors. Some of her songs are still popular like Manasuna mallela, Pilichina biguvatara,Oh baatasaari, Kila Kila Navvulu, Oh Pavurama, Preme Neramauna, Srikara karunaalavaala, Sharanam nee divya charanam and many more in Telugu; and Azhagaana Ponn Naan, Vaarai Inbam Thaaraai, Nilaa Nilaa Odi Vaa, Thalai Vaari Poochoodi Unnai, Kannile Iruppathenna and Annai Enbadhu Neethaanaa in Tamil. She also provided music to a lot of her films.

During her later years, she served on various movie related organizations. She was a Member of State Film Awards Committee for two years. She was also a Visiting Professor at the Film Institute for one year. She was Member of Children Film Society for 5 years, from 1965 to 1970.

In India, she was the first and the only woman to have owned a film studio, first actress to act in a dual role and the first woman to have directed a movie simultaneously in three languages.

On occasion of World Women's day, Sakshi Sunday magazine listed the most successful women from every industry and she was listed in the one for those from the movie industry. It was also added that the present highly successful heroines could not reach the heights Bhanumathi reached and that it is an impossible task for anyone to reach her level of success.

Literary career
Bhanumathi was also a talented writer with a number of short stories to her credit. Her autobiography Nalo Nenu was published in Telugu and later, released in English as Musings. Andhra Pradesh Sahitya Academy awarded her as the best short story writer for her popular short stories "Attagari Kathalu". She was a Member of Lalit Kala Academy for 5 years, and Sahitya Academy, Andhra Pradesh for 10 years. She served as Director and Principal of the Tamil Nadu Government Music College,

Philanthropy
She was an eminent social worker who was closely associated with a number of Social Service Organizations. She was the founder member and treasurer of Madras branch of Altrusa International Inc., Chicago for lifelong starting from 1963. She was a life member of the 'Red Cross Society'. She established an educational institution named as "Dr. Bhanumathi Ramakrishna Matriculation School" at Saligramam, Chennai providing free education to the poor.

Personal life
During the shooting of the film Krishna Prema (1943), she met P. S. Ramakrishna Rao (19181986), an assistant director for that film. He was a film producer, director and editor of Telugu and Tamil Films. The couple married on 8 August 1943 and have one son, Bharani. Later they launched a popular production company, Bharani Pictures on their son's name. She died at the age of 80 years in Chennai.

Awards
Civilian honors
Padma Bhushan in 2001
Padma Shri in 1966

Rashtrapati Award in acting
Annai in 1962
Antastulu in 1965
Palnati Yuddham in 1966

National Film Awards
 Government National Award for Best Writer for the book "Nalo Nenu" an autobiography in 1994.

Filmfare Awards South
Filmfare Lifetime Achievement Award – South (1987)

Nandi Awards
Raghupathi Venkaiah Award, from the Government of Andhra Pradesh, in 1985
 Nandi Award for Best Director in 1986
NTR National Award, from the Government of Andhra Pradesh, in 2000

Tamil Nadu State Film Awards
Tamil Nadu State Film Honorary Award – "Arignar Anna Award" in 1992

State Awards
Kalaimamani (connoisseur of arts), Government of Tamil Nadu, in 1983

Other honors
Kalaprapoorna, Andhra University, Visakhapatnam, in 1975
 Honorary Doctorate, Sri Venkateswara University, Tirupathi, in 1984
Raja-Lakshmi Award for the year 1998 from Sri Raja-Lakshmi Foundation, Chennai
C.N.Annadurai honoured her with a title "Nadippukku Ilakkanam" for her remarkable performance in "Rangoon Radha"
 She was one of the dignitaries been honored by Andhra Pradesh government at the time of state formation in 1956.

Filmography

See also
 Raghupathi Venkaiah Award

References

బహుముఖ ప్రజ్ఞాశాలి

External links

1925 births
2005 deaths
Andhra University alumni
Indian women songwriters
Indian film actresses
Indian women film producers
Film producers from Andhra Pradesh
20th-century Indian actresses
Indian women film directors
People from Ongole
Recipients of the Rashtrapati Award
Recipients of the Padma Bhushan in arts
Recipients of the Padma Shri in arts
Telugu actresses
Telugu film producers
20th-century Indian singers
Film directors from Andhra Pradesh
20th-century Indian film directors
20th-century Indian women artists
20th-century Indian women singers
21st-century Indian singers
21st-century Indian women singers
21st-century Indian women artists
Film musicians from Andhra Pradesh
Women musicians from Andhra Pradesh
Businesswomen from Andhra Pradesh
20th-century Indian businesswomen
20th-century Indian businesspeople